Kato Lefkara is a village in the Larnaca District of Cyprus. Its population in 2011 was 128.

References

External links 
Official website of the Community Council of Kato Lefkara

Communities in Larnaca District